"I Love My Life" is a song co-written and recorded by American country music artist Jamie O'Neal.  It was released in December 2005 as the third single from the album Brave.  The song reached #26 on the Billboard Hot Country Songs chart.  The song was written by O'Neal, Tim Nichols and Shaye Smith.

Chart performance

References

2005 singles
2005 songs
Jamie O'Neal songs
Songs written by Tim Nichols
Songs written by Jamie O'Neal
Songs written by Shaye Smith
Song recordings produced by Keith Stegall
Capitol Records Nashville singles